Jacob Tanner Ceresna (born July 9, 1994) is an American football defensive end for the Edmonton Elks of the Canadian Football League (CFL). He played college football at Cortland. Ceresna has also been a member of the New York Jets, Ottawa Redblacks, Edmonton Eskimos and New York Giants.

College career 
Ceresna played one season for Southern Connecticut State before transferring to SUNY Cortland. He graduated from Cortland with a B.S. cum laude in exercise science in 2016.

Professional career

New York Jets 
After going undrafted in the 2016 NFL Draft, Ceresna signed with the New York Jets on August 14, 2016. He was Waived/Injured on August 30, 2016 and placed on the injury reserve after sustaining a lower body injury.

Ottawa Redblacks 
After recording two sacks and eighteen tackles in his rookie season, Ceresna was traded to the Edmonton Eskimos for defensive end Odell Willis.

Edmonton Eskimos 
Ceresna amassed 32 defensive tackles and 8 sacks in 18 games with the Eskimos. Ceresna was released by the Eskimos on January 2, 2019 in order for him to sign with the New York Giants.

New York Giants 
On January 2, 2019, Ceresna signed a reserve/future contract with the New York Giants. Ceresna was released by the Giants on August 31, 2019 during final roster cuts.

XFL 
In October 2019, Ceresna was drafted by the DC Defenders in the open phase of the 2020 XFL Draft. Ceresna decided to not sign with the XFL and to remain in the CFL, citing the lack of a Players Association.

Edmonton Eskimos / Elks (II) 
On November 5, 2019, Ceresna was signed to the Eskimos' practice roster after a brief stint with the New York Giants. He signed a futures contract for the 2020 season on November 19, 2019, however the season was later cancelled due to the Covid-19 pandemic. In  his first season back with Edmonton Ceresna played in 13 of 14 regular season games,  contributing with a career high 34 defensive tackles and five sacks. He signed a contract extension through the 2022 season on January 11, 2021. Ceresna had a breakout campaign in 2022, registering 10 quarterback sacks and he was named a CFL All-Star as a result. On January 11, 2023 Ceresna and the Elks agreed to a two-year contract extension.

Coaching career 
Ceresna was briefly the assistant offensive line coach for Cortland State before he signed with the New York Jets.

References 

1994 births
Living people
American football defensive ends
American players of Canadian football
Cortland Red Dragons football players
Cortland Red Dragons football coaches
Edmonton Elks players
New York Giants players
New York Jets players
Ottawa Redblacks players
People from New Fairfield, Connecticut
Players of American football from Connecticut
Sportspeople from Fairfield County, Connecticut
Canadian football defensive linemen